Gabriel Ogando (22 August 1921 – 16 July 2006) was an Argentine footballer. He played in five matches for the Argentina national football team from 1945 to 1952. He was also part of Argentina's squad for the 1946 South American Championship.

References

External links
 
 

1921 births
2006 deaths
Argentine footballers
Argentina international footballers
Place of birth missing
Association football goalkeepers
Estudiantes de La Plata footballers
Club Atlético Huracán footballers
Club Atlético River Plate footballers